Symmoriiformes is an extinct order of holocephalians. Originally named Symmoriida by Zangerl (1981), it has subsequently been known by several other names. Lund (1986) synonymized the group with Cladodontida, while Maisey (2008) corrected the name to Symmoriiformes in order to prevent it from being mistaken for a family. The symmoriiform fossils record begins during the late Devonian. Most of them died out at the start of the Permian, but Dwykaselachus is known from the Artinskian-Kungurian of South Africa. Teeth described from the Valanginian of France and Austria indicate that members of the family Falcatidae might have survived until the Early Cretaceous; however, these teeth were also argued to be more likely neoselachian teeth.

Fossil distribution

Fossil evidence of Symmoriida have been found at Bear Gulch, Fergus County, Montana, Bethel Quarry, Pike County, Indiana, Kinshozan quarry, Alaska, Gifu Prefecture, Japan, Bashkortostan, Russian Federation and possibly also France.

Classification 
The symmoriiformes have been assigned to Cladoselachii by Goto et al. (1988), to Elasmobranchii by Williams (1998), and to Chondrichthyes by Sepkoski in 2002 and by Maisey in 2008. 

The uncrushed braincase of Dwykaselachus indicates that symmoriiforms are members of Holocephali, as much of the internal anatomy, including the otic labyrinth and brain space configuration are similar to those of chimaeras.

Gallery

References

http://palaeo.gly.bris.ac.uk/benton/vertclass.html

Symmoriiformes
Prehistoric cartilaginous fish orders